Blissus arenarius is a species of true bug in the family Blissidae. It is found in North America.

Subspecies
These two subspecies belong to the species Blissus arenarius:
 Blissus arenarius arenarius Barber, 1918
 Blissus arenarius maritimus Leonard, 1966

References

Blissidae
Articles created by Qbugbot
Insects described in 1918